"Listen to the Band" is a song by American pop rock band the Monkees, released on Colgems single 5004 on April 26, 1969. Written by Michael Nesmith, it is the first time Nesmith sang lead vocals on a Monkees single A-side.

Background
The song was written during Nesmith's RCA Nashville sessions and recording commenced on June 1, 1968. It was completed on December 9, 1968 at RCA studios in Los Angeles, with a horn section added to the track (arranged by Shorty Rogers).

"Listen to the Band" was first heard in a live performance on the Monkees' television special 33 1/3 Revolutions Per Monkee (filmed in late 1968), with Peter Tork making his final appearance before leaving the band. The one-hour special aired on NBC on April 14, 1969, and the single was released 12 days later.

The single's flip side, "Someday Man", was a song written by Paul Williams and Roger Nichols and produced by Bones Howe. It was sung by Jones and recorded at the same time as Goffin and King's "A Man Without a Dream", which had appeared on the Monkees' previous album, Instant Replay (1969). "Someday Man" was heavily promoted in trade ads and was designated as the "plug side" on the promotional single, peaking on the Billboard chart at No. 81. However, DJs began to prefer the B-side, and Colgems accordingly began making updated picture sleeves, with "Listen to the Band" now listed as the A-side. The single reached No. 63 on the Billboard charts.

The song was later included on the Monkees' album The Monkees Present, released on Colgems 117 on October 11, 1969. The Monkees were by now a trio (Nesmith, Micky Dolenz and Davy Jones), with Peter Tork having left in December 1968. The album version runs 2 minutes and 45 seconds, 15 seconds longer than the single version.

In 1970, Nesmith re-recorded the song with The First National Band for their second album, Loose Salute. The updated recording faded in through the first verse and reached full volume on the words "Listen to the band".

Composition
The song includes a long held cadenza on the electric guitar that rises from G to the key of C with the accompaniment of the organ before Nesmith repeats the spoken title of the song to "Listen to the Band". The song features a brass section that plays during the instrumental section as if the brass were the band. The song ends with the recorded sound of an audience cheering for the band, sourced from the album 144 Genuine Sound Effects on the Mercury Hill label. Nesmith later revealed that the chord progression of "Listen to the Band" was created by playing another song he wrote, "Nine Times Blue", backwards.

Chart performance

References 

 Rhino Records's The Monkees Present CD booklet liner notes by Andrew Sandoval

External links 
 http://monkee45s.net/USA/66-5004.html

1969 songs
The Monkees songs
Songs written by Michael Nesmith
Songs about music
Country rock songs
American country music songs